Philippe Russo is a French singer-songwriter (born on 4 October 1961, Paris). He had a hit between 1986 and early 1987 in France with his single "Magie noire", devoted to the discothèques, which peaked at #10 on the SNEP Singles Chart. Then he published several singles until 1991, but they were unsuccessful and failed to reach the chart. Therefore, Russo can be deemed a one-hit wonder. He was the guitar of Marc Lavoine during this one's last concert tour.

Discography

Singles

References

1961 births
French male singers
French-language singers
French pop singers
French singer-songwriters
Living people
Writers from Paris
French male singer-songwriters